The 1997 NAIA Division I women's basketball tournament was the tournament held by the NAIA to determine the national champion of women's college basketball among its Division I members in the United States and Canada for the 1996–97 basketball season.

Three-time defending champions Southern Nazarene defeated Union (TN) in the championship game, 78–73, to claim the Redskins' fifth NAIA national title.

The tournament was played at the Oman Arena in Jackson, Tennessee.

Qualification

The tournament field remained fixed at thirty-two teams, with the top sixteen teams receiving seeds. 

The tournament continued to utilize a simple single-elimination format.

Bracket

See also
1997 NAIA Division I men's basketball tournament
1997 NCAA Division I women's basketball tournament
1997 NCAA Division II women's basketball tournament
1997 NCAA Division III women's basketball tournament
1997 NAIA Division II women's basketball tournament

References

NAIA
NAIA Women's Basketball Championships
1997 in sports in Tennessee